Westerham Common, also known as Westerham Heath, was a cricket ground near Westerham in west Kent. It was used primarily in the 18th century when historically significant matches were played.

In May 1730, a single wicket match between four men of Kent, captained by Edwin Stead, and four of Brentford was played for a wager of £50. This was the first game in what became a tri-series. In June 1768, Westerham and Caterham, captained by Henry Rowett, played Bourne Cricket Club, captained by Sir Horatio Mann. The Heath was used as a cricket venue occasionally in the 20th century.

References

1730 establishments in England
Cricket grounds in Kent
Defunct cricket grounds in England
Defunct sports venues in Kent
English cricket venues in the 18th century
History of Kent
Sports venues completed in 1730
Westerham